Tom Hugh Morey (15 August 1935 – 14 October 2021), also known by the moniker "Y", was a musician, engineer, surfboard shaper, and surfer responsible for several technological innovations that have heavily influenced modern developments in surfing equipment design.

Biography
Morey was born in Detroit, Michigan in 1935. By 1944, he was living in Laguna Beach, California, and was avidly developing his talent for drumming. He became a professional musician in the 1950s. He was an avid performer of jazz. While surfing as a hobby he attended the University of Southern California and graduated with a B.A. in mathematics in 1957. He married Jolly Givens in 1958 and worked for Douglas Aircraft, as a process engineer in composites. After Douglas, he worked a series of jobs involving composite materials and processes, which he applied to his surf-related inventions. He left the corporate world for good in 1964, moved to Ventura and started a series of companies that served the surfing market. Morey also sponsored surfing competitions such as The Tom Morey Invitational. Morey's marriage produced two daughters, Michelle (deceased) and Melinda (artist and surfer) before ending in divorce in the late 1960s.

Morey was an adherent of the Baháʼí Faith from 1970 after he came across a 'unity feast' at a Kauai beach, where "whites, blacks and Hawaiians, mixed cordially".  "After a couple of months of attending informal meetings on Baháʼí teachings - I realized this was something very important not to toy with; rather to become immersed in." "I withdrew immediately from alcohol, drugs and sexual promiscuity." Morey attributed inspiration for invention of the Boogie board (on 7 July 1971) to a particular Baha'i prayer he kept coming across which included the passage "confer upon me thoughts which may change this world into a rose garden." He founded the company Morey Boogie shortly thereafter. Morey later married Marchia Nichols, now Marchia Morey, known as the "mother of bodyboarding", who bore them four sons: Sol, Moon, Sky, and Matteson.

Morey sold Morey Boogie in 1977 and lived in Hawaii for a decade, working as a consultant by day, jazz musician by night. By 1977, he was producing 80,000 bodyboards per year. In 1985, the Moreys moved to Bainbridge Island, Washington, where Morey worked as an engineer for the Boeing Corporation. In 1992 he returned to southern California where he reentered the surf scene, consulting on the Wham-O Boogie®Board and with the new company Morey Bodyboards. Morey ended consulting in January 1999 founding his own company again - TomMorey.com - and changed his name to Y.

From 1999 to 2007, Morey focused on developing new, soft-surfboard technology. He handmade these boards in a small workshop in Carlsbad, California. His most famous of these was the Swizzle, a parabolic-shaped longboard design. Morey marketed and sold the boards under the name Surfboards by Y.

In late-2007, Morey joined forces with Catch Surf of San Clemente, California, to bring his new technology to the masses. His revolutionary new surfboard technology fused the safety and durability of soft surfboards with the performance of a hard surfboard.

Morey died on 14 October 2021 at the age of 86.

Musician
Morey honed his talent as a drummer and ukulele player from his early youth, working professionally by the age of 12. Subsequently he performed professionally with musicians such as Dizzy Gillespie, Stu Williamson, Bud Shank and Conte Candoli. He was an original member of the 'Sons of the Beach' ukulele 1948, then, over the years founded several other bands: 'Four Eyed Five' in 1950, the 'Tom Morey Quartet' in 1954, and URANIUM in 1969. He joined 'Brotherhood' at the Mauna Kea Beach Hotel in 1983, and played at Salt Creek Grill in Dana Point, California with his most recent ensemble, Laguna Jazz Quartet. He also played in with Dene Davidson's Cool Jazz quintet, with Keith Bishop on saxophone, Joey Carano on guitar, Davidson on electric bass, Leonard Thompson on keyboards, and Morey on drums.

Surfing
In 1946, at the age of 11, Morey came in second in the Green Valley Lake Paddle board Championships. He began board surfing in 1952. In April 1955 he wake-surfed (no towrope) behind an ocean-going yacht.

From 1955 to 1963, Morey was a sponsored surfer for Dave Godart Surfboards, then Dave Sweet, Con, Velzy Jacobs, and finally Dewey Weber. In 1964 he began setting up businesses providing surf boards and inventing technologies for surf boards: 
 1954 - created the first "concave nose pocket"
 1955 - invented something he called the "Wing Tip," a Coaund Lift nose.
 1964 - created the first polypropylene fin and first commercial interchangeable fin system.
 1965 - used resin-impregnated corrigated cardboard to make a "paper surfboard" for which there was a television commercial and an August 1966, full color, two page advertisement in Reader's Digest.
 1965 - created the Tom Morey Invitational Nose Riding Championships, first professional surfing contest held at Ventura Point.
 1971 - invented the bodyboard, called in those days a Boogie Board after Morey's love of music.
 1974–1976 - engineered the essence of today's "soft board" manufacturing technology.

Morey left commercial surfboarding interests in the late 1970s and returned to them in the 1990s.

References

External links

 Tom Morey's Surfboards by Y and Catch Surf
 TomMorey.com
 
 Tom Morey bio on surfline.com
 Comments of Mike Doyle 1
 HI Surf Advisory Tom Morey
 Industry News  The Birth Of The Bodyboard Industry: The Tom Morey Story
 Vagabond.com Response to the "What is killing Bodyboarding?" series by Tom Morey
 A Malibu Surf Dog Barks
 LATimes.com Stoking the masses Once upon a time, folks rode waves on surfboards or air mattresses. Then Tom Morey put an iron to a hunk of foam.
 Tom Morey = The Mad Scientist of Wave Riding
 The Hey Day.com Sultan of surf, baron of boogie

1935 births
2021 deaths
American inventors
American surfers
American Bahá'ís
Bodyboarders
University of Southern California alumni
Converts to the Bahá'í Faith
20th-century Bahá'ís
21st-century Bahá'ís